The 2020 NCAA Division II women's basketball tournament was due to be the 39th annual tournament hosted by the NCAA to determine the national champion of Division II women's  collegiate basketball in the United States. The tournament, however, was cancelled due to the COVID-19 pandemic and no champion was crowned for the 2019–20 season.

The championship rounds were scheduled for the Birmingham CrossPlex in Birmingham, Alabama.

Bracket

Atlantic Regional
 Site: Indiana, Pennsylvania (Indiana (PA))

South Regional
 Site: Cleveland, Tennessee (Lee)

Central Regional
 Site: Warrensburg, Missouri (Central Missouri)

Midwest Regional
 Site: Springfield, Missouri (Drury)

East Regional
 Site: Garden City, New York (Adelphi)

Southeast Regional
 Site: Greenwood, South Carolina (Lander)

South Central Regional
 Site: Lubbock, Texas (Lubbock Christian)

West Regional
 Site: Honolulu, Hawaii (Hawaii Pacific)

See also
 2020 NCAA Division I women's basketball tournament
 2020 NCAA Division III women's basketball tournament
 2020 NAIA Division I women's basketball tournament
 2020 NAIA Division II women's basketball tournament
 2020 NCAA Division II men's basketball tournament

References

 
NCAA Division II women's basketball tournament
NCAA Division II women's basketball tournament, 2020
2020 in sports in Alabama